Christian Tshimanga Kabeya (born 16 June 1987) is a Belgian amateur footballer. He began his career at Aston Villa, playing in the 2004 FA Youth Cup final. He later moved on to AGOVV Apeldoorn in the Eerste Divisie (second) division of Dutch football but left the club in 2009 after two seasons. Returning to England, he played for amateur side Heath Hayes.

Career
Born in Kinshasa, Democratic Republic of the Congo, Kabeya began his playing career with K.S.K. Ronse before he quickly moved to join top flight club Belgian club Excelsior Mouscron.  Interest was soon hotting up for the talented youngster, and Aston Villa soon joined the array of interesting parties, trying to capture Kabeya on a scholarship deal. This initially failed, but merely a few months later, out of contract Kabeya opted to sign for Villa. He eventually signed the contract in July 2003.

After an excellent opening season for the academy, Kabeya helped Aston Villa to the final of the 2003-04 FA Youth Cup, despite losing to a much more experienced Middlesbrough team.

In December 2006 he was sacked by Aston Villa and jailed for four months for stealing £5,000 from a team-mate.

On the international front, Kabeya (despite being born in the Democratic Republic of the Congo) has represented Belgium at U16, U17, U18 and  U19 level.

He later signed for AGOVV Apeldoorn, but was released in 2009. He later played for Midland Alliance club Heath Hayes.

References

1987 births
Living people
Belgian footballers
Association football midfielders
Aston Villa F.C. players
Expatriate footballers in England
AGOVV Apeldoorn players
Heath Hayes F.C. players
Eerste Divisie players
Belgian expatriate sportspeople in the Netherlands
Belgian expatriate footballers
Expatriate footballers in the Netherlands
Democratic Republic of the Congo emigrants to Belgium
Belgian expatriate sportspeople in England
Democratic Republic of the Congo expatriate footballers
Democratic Republic of the Congo expatriate sportspeople in Belgium
Democratic Republic of the Congo expatriate sportspeople in the Netherlands
Democratic Republic of the Congo expatriate sportspeople in England
Footballers from Kinshasa